Sourpi is a village and a former municipality in Magnesia, Thessaly, Greece. It is predominantly populated by Aromanians (Vlachs). Since the 2011 local government reform it is part of the municipality Almyros, of which it is a municipal unit. The municipal unit has an area of 191.335 km2. Population 2,867 (2011).

References

Populated places in Magnesia (regional unit)
Aromanian settlements in Greece